Henry Flores (born August 26, 1974 in San Pedro Sula, Honduras) is a professional American photographer who focuses on modern pop culture.  He founded Buzz Foto and Out Of Sight Media in 2006.

Henry's photographs can be seen in hundreds of publications including "People", "the New York Times", "Los Angeles Times", "Us Weekly", "Life & Style", "National Enquirer" and "OK! Magazine".

Henry Flores' prints have been exhibited in galleries in Los Angeles, Seyhoun Gallery in Beverly Hills and is currently exhibiting a more permanent exhibition at one of the Sheraton Hotels and Resorts, the Sheraton Gateway Los Angeles inside the Paparazzi Restaurant.

Early and personal life

Henry Flores was born in San Pedro Sula, Honduras to parents from Honduras. He says he did not learn to speak English until he migrated to the USA and went to school. He graduated high school in 1992 from Don Bosco Technical Institute and in 1999, received his Bachelor of Science in Electrical Engineering with a concentration in Electronics Design and Software Design from California Polytechnic State University in San Luis Obispo. He also received a minor in Psychology. Henry Flores currently resides in Los Angeles, California.

Bibliography
 A Day in the Life of the Paparazzi! – Hard Cover with Dust Jacket (August 2010 Blurb, Inc.)  
 A Day in the Life of the Paparazzi! – Paperback/Soft Cover (August 2010 Blurb, Inc.)

Exhibits
 Seyhoun Gallery – Paparazzi As An Art Form! by Buzz Foto, Brad Elterman, and Henry Flores, February 15, 2008 – February 21, 2008 Beverly Hills, CA
 Sheraton Hotels and Resorts, Sheraton Gateway Los Angeles inside the Paparazzi Restaurant – A Day in the Life of the Paparazzi! by Henry Flores, July 1, 2010–present El Segundo, CA

Filmography

Film

Television

References

External links
 Henry Flores' Official Site (Official Site)
 Henry Flores' Official Global Picture Agency, BuzzFoto (Official Site)
 Henry Flores' Official Paparazzi Site, OutOfSightMedia (Official Site)
 Henry Flores' Official Book Site (Official Book Site)
 Henry Flores Twitter (Official Twitter page)

American male bloggers
American bloggers
American talk radio hosts
Honduran emigrants to the United States
American photographers
American gossip columnists
American infotainers
Hispanic and Latino American writers
Hispanic and Latino American artists
California Polytechnic State University alumni
Artists from Los Angeles
1974 births
Living people